1998 in Armenian football was the seventh season of independent football after the split-up from the Soviet Union. The Armenian Premier League for 1998 existed of ten teams of which the top six would qualify for the championship stage, while the other four would enter the relegation stage.

Premier League
Aragats FC is promoted.
FC Kotayk were expelled for not paying taxes.

First stage league table

Championship stage league table

Relegation stage league table

Promotion and relegation play-off

Top goalscorers

First League
 Alashkert Martuni, FIMA Yerevan, and FC Nig Aparan returned to professional football.
 Aragats Ashtarak are renamed back to Kasakh Ashtarak.
 Dinamo Yerevan are renamed Dinamo-Energo Yerevan.
 SKVV Yerevan and FC Moush Kasakh are introduced to the league.

League table

Armenia Cup

External links
 RSSSF: Armenia 1998